Richard Ned Lebow  is an American political scientist best known for his work in international relations, political psychology, classics and philosophy of science. He is Professor of International Political Theory at the Department of War Studies, King's College London, Honorary Fellow of Pembroke College, University of Cambridge, and James O. Freedman Presidential Professor Emeritus at Dartmouth College. Lebow also writes fiction. He has published a novel and collection of short stories and has recently finished a second novel.

Early life and education
Lebow was born in 1941 in France and was a refugee from Europe, the only member of his family to survive World War II. He was taken to an orphanage before being adopted by an American family and grew up in New York City. He graduated from Lynbrook Senior High School in 1959 in Long Island, New York.

Lebow gained his BA degree from the University of Chicago, his masters from Yale University and his doctorate from City University of New York.

Career

Lebow taught political science, international relations, political psychology, political theory, methodology, public policy at universities in the United States and Europe and strategy at the Naval and National War Colleges. From 2002 until becoming emeritus in 2012, he was James O. Freedman Presidential Professor of Government at Dartmouth College. He taught courses in international relations, political psychology, political theory and Greek literature and philosophy. Since 2012, He has been professor of international political theory in the War Studies department of King’s College London and Bye-Fellow of Pembroke College, University of Cambridge. He taught courses on philosophy of science, scope and methods and ancient Greek conceptions of order and justice.

Lebow is a realist.

Lebow has held visiting positions, including:

Olof Palme Professor, University of Lund, 2011–12
Centennial Professor of International Relations at the London School of Economics, 2009–11
Visiting fellow at Pembroke College, University of Cambridge, 2010–11
Visiting Professor, University of Cambridge, 2008-2011
Former President of the International Society of Political Psychology
Onassis Foundation Fellow in Ancient Greek History and Culture
Overseas Fellow at St John's College, University of Cambridge

Controversy 
In 2018, Lebow was accused of making an inappropriate joke riding in an elevator during a conference. Simona Sharoni, a feminist scholar and activist, took offense at the joke and reported Lebow to the International Studies Association (ISA). Lebow emailed her to apologize, but said that focusing on minor offences harms the general fight for women rights. He refused to apologize in the way that the ISA demanded from him.

Honours 

 Co-recipient conference grant on the fragility and robustness of political orders, Swedish Foundation of Humanities and Social Sciences, 2020
 Choice Outstanding Academic Title Award, for Avoiding War, Making Peace, 2018
 Honourable Mention, Susan Strange Book Award for the best book of the year in international relations from the British International Studies Association for The Rise and Fall of Political Orders (Cambridge: Cambridge University Press, 2019
 Co-recipient Leverhulme Research Grant (Shakespeare and War), 2018
 Election to the British Academy, 2017
 Honorable Mention, Charles A. Taylor Book Award for the best book in interpretative 	methodologies and methods, for Causation in International Relations, 2016
 Honorary Doctorate, Panteion University, Athens, Greece, 2015
 Choice Outstanding Academic Title Award, for Toni Erskine and Richard Ned Lebow, Tragedy and International Relations, 2014
 Teaching Excellence Award, King's College London, 2013
 Distinguished Scholar, International Studies Association, 2014
 Alexander L. George Award from the International Society of Political Psychology for the best book of the year (The Politics and Ethics of Identity)
 Honorary Doctorate, American University of Paris, 2013
 Robert Jervis-Paul Schroeder Award for the best book in international history and politics from the American Political Science Association (A Cultural Theory of International Relations), 2009
 Susan Strange Award for the best book international relations from the British International Studies Association (A Cultural Theory of International Relations), 2009

Fiction 
 Rough Waters and Other Stories (Ethics International Press, 2022)
 Obsession(murder mystery) (Pegasus, 2022)

Scholarly Books since 2003 
 Justice, East and West, and International Order, coauthored with Feng Zhang, (Oxford, 2022)
 The Robust and Fragility of Political Orders, coedited with Ludvig Norman, (Cambridge, 2022)
 The Quest for Knowledge in International Relations: How Do We Know? (Cambridge, 2022)
 Reason and Cause: Social Science in a Social World (Cambridge, 2020)
 Between Peace and War: 40th Anniversary Revised Edition (Palgrave-Macmillan, 2020)
 Ethics and International Relations: A Tragic Perspective (Cambridge, 2020)
 Between Peace and War: 40th Anniversary Edition (Palgrave-Macmillan, 2020)
 Taming Sino-American Rivalry, coauthored with Feng Zhang, (Oxford 2020)
 A Democratic Foreign Policy (Palgrave-Macmillan 2018)
 The Rise and Fall of Political Orders (Cambridge, 2018).
 
 
 
  4 vols.
 
 
 
 
 
 
 
 
Winner of the Jervis-Schroeder Award (American Political Science Association) for the best book in history and international relations.
Winner of the Susan Strange Award (British International Studies Association) for the best book of the year.
 
 
Winner of the Alexander L. George Award for the best book in political psychology.

References

External links 
 King's College faculty web page
 Interview with Lebow by Theory Talk
 Lebow on his forthcoming political orde book, Joint Area Symposium, University of Illinois, 2017 
 Interview with and photo of Lebow following his election to the British Academy

1942 births
Academics of King's College London
American political scientists
Constructivist international relations scholars
Dartmouth College faculty
Fellows of Pembroke College, Cambridge
Fellows of the British Academy
Living people
Lynbrook Senior High School alumni
Political psychologists